"Pale Movie" is a song by British pop group Saint Etienne, released in February 1994 as the first single from their third album, Tiger Bay (1994). It reached number 28 on the UK Singles Charts and also became a hit in Iceland, peaking at number 24. In common with the folk music theme of the album, the song combines a Eurodance beat with Spanish folk-style guitars. The lyrics use surreal imagery to describe a man's love for a mysterious woman. Although the title is not sung, some of the words refer to cinema: "In the bed where they make love / She's in a film on the sheets. / He shows dreams like a movie, / She's the softness of cinema seats." Other lines are stranger: "her skin as white as the milk, / Just like a Sherpa Tenzing / under a Manila silk."

In an interview with Melody Maker magazine, keyboard player Pete Wiggs said that he considers the song "potentially brilliant" but "a bit of a failure"; he feels that the band "stuck too rigidly to our folk idea". He also adds that they only chose Spanish guitar so that they could go to Spain for the video  

The cover art for the single features photographs of swimming tigers, presumably in reference to the album title.

Critical reception
Tim Sendra from AllMusic praised "Pale Movie" as "one of their "strongest, most emotional songs." He felt that "the melancholy fairly oozes from the aching strings, the very sad chords, and Sarah Cracknell's unusually emotional vocals." In his weekly UK chart commentary, James Masterton wrote, "Something really has gone wrong when a band like Saint Etienne make a string of such beautiful records and yet have still to have a really big hit." He concluded, "I will happily dance naked around campus if this is a massive hit". Pan-European magazine Music & Media commented, "Continentals should forget about their "too British" prejudice. With a bit of patience the same flower can flourish out of this synth pop band as happened last year to the Beloved." Brad Beatnik from Music Weeks RM Dance Update deemed it "a typically light, if a little moodier, tune". Another editor, James Hamilton, described it as a "Kraftwerk-ishly pulsed lengthily pausing 134.3bpm ethereal swirler". Rob Sheffield from Rolling Stone declared it a "perfect" UK hit. Tony Cross from Smash Hits gave it five out of five, adding, "Ai Carumba! Go la-la with the Saints as their latest dip into the pop palette comes up with a Spanish sunset yellow that rattles your castanets and perks up your paella with a saucy salsa beat. Lose the winter blues and join them on the Costa Del Pop for an early vacation — NOW!"

Music video
The accompanying music video for "Pale Movie" was shot in Spain and features the band riding around the countryside of Nerja on scooters.

Track listings
All tracks were written and composed by Bob Stanley and Pete Wiggs.
 7-inch and cassette, Heavenly / HVN 37, HVN 37 C (UK) "Pale Movie" – 3:51
 "Highgate Road Incident" – 2:06

 12-inch and CD, Heavenly / HVN 37 12, HVN 37 CD (UK)'
 "Pale Movie" – 3:51
 "Pale Movie" (stentorian dub) – 6:46
 "Pale Movie" (secret knowledge trouser assassin mix) – 10:16
 "Pale Movie" (lemonentry mix) – 4:05

Charts

References

1994 singles
Saint Etienne (band) songs
Songs written by Bob Stanley (musician)
Songs written by Pete Wiggs
Heavenly Recordings singles
1994 songs